Anders de Wahl, (9 March 1869 – 9 March 1956) was a Swedish actor.

Biography
He was the son of the music director Oscar de Wahl (1832–1873) and  opera singer Anna Lundström de Wahl (1844–1889). de Wahl was a student at the Royal Dramatic Theater in 1889–91, employed by the August Lindberg Theater Company 1891–92,  at the Albert Ranft Theater Company 1892–1907 and at the Royal Dramatic Theatre 1907–19. He was mostly an actor of the stage but appeared in several roles in films between 1920 and 1946.

Selected filmography
 Erotikon (1920)
 The Mill (1921)
 Kalle Utter (1925)
 The Flying Dutchman (1925)
 What Do Men Know? (1933)
 Med folket för fosterlandet (1938)
 Hans Majestät får vänta (1945)
 Eviga länkar (1946)

References

Other sources
Wennerholm, Eric (1974)   Anders de Wahl : människan bakom maskerna  (Stockholm: Albert Bonniers)

External links

1869 births
1956 deaths
Male actors from Stockholm
Swedish male film actors
Swedish male silent film actors
20th-century Swedish male actors
Swedish people of Belgian descent